"Live / Magic" is the second single released by Japanese pop duo AMOYAMO. The single is a double a-side single featuring the songs "Live" and "Magic", and was released March 27, 2013. The song peaked at #26 on the Oricon singles chart, and charted for two weeks.

Track listing

References

2013 singles
Defstar Records singles